Inside Moves is a 1984 studio album by American jazz musician Grover Washington Jr. released via Elektra label.

Reception
Scott Yanow of AllMusic wrote "Although Grover Washington Jr. (on alto, tenor, soprano and baritone) puts on his usual strong effort, the forgettable material (which included no hits) and the emphasis on vocals (particularly those of Jon Lucien who is on five of the seven selections) makes this one of Washington's weaker efforts and the least essential of his four Elektra recordings. The background vocalists do not help much either. This was Grover Washington, Jr.'s only full-length album as a leader during the 1982-86 period but was not worth the effort".

Track listing

Personnel 
 Grover Washington, Jr. – alto, baritone, soprano and tenor saxophones
 Richard Tee – Fender Rhodes
 Marcus Miller – Roland Jupiter-8, Yamaha DX7, bass (1, 2, 4-7)
 Eric Gale – guitars
 Anthony Jackson – bass (3)
 Steve Gadd – drums (1)
 Buddy Williams – drums (2-7)
 Ralph MacDonald – drum programming, congas, percussion (1-4), arrangements 
 Anthony MacDonald – percussion (5, 6, 7)
 William Eaton – arrangements, backing vocals (3)
 Jon Lucien – featured vocals  
 Frank Floyd – backing vocals (3)
 Hilda Harris – backing vocals (3)
 Yvonne Lewis – backing vocals (3, 5, 6)
 Ullanda McCullough – backing vocals (3)
 Zack Saunders – backing vocals (3)
 Lani Groves – backing vocals (5, 6)
 Maeretha Stewart – backing vocals (5, 6)

Strings on "Watching You Watching Me"
 Alfred Brown – conductor
 William Eaton – leader 
 Jonathan Abramowitz – cello
 Kermit Moore – cello 
 Julien Barber – viola 
 Sanford Allen – violin 
 Lewis Eley – violin
 Max Ellen – violin 
 Winterton Garvey – violin
 Paul Gershman – violin 
 Theodore Israel – violin 
 Harry Lookofsky – violin 
 Marvin Morgenstern – violin 
 David Nadien – violin 
 Matthew Raimondi – violin

Production 
 Grover Washington, Jr. – producer, mixing
 Ralph MacDonald – producer 
 William Eaton – co-producer 
 William Salter – co-producer
 Kendall Brown – engineer 
 Ed Heath – assistant engineer 
 Peter Humphreys – mixing 
 Barry Craig – mix assistant 
 Scott E. MacMinn – mix assistant
 Nimitr Sarikananda – mastering 
 Carol Friedman – art direction, photography 
 JoDee Stringham – design 

Studios
 Mixed at Sigma Sound Studios (Philadelphia, PA).
 Mastered at Frankford Wayne (Philadelphia, PA).

Charts

References

Grover Washington Jr. albums
1984 albums
Elektra Records albums